The Sydney Thunder are an Australian franchise professional cricket team, competing in Australia's domestic Twenty20 cricket competition, the Big Bash League. Along with the Sydney Sixers, the Thunder are the successors of the New South Wales Blues who played in the now-defunct KFC Twenty20 Big Bash. The team's home ground is Sydney Showground Stadium.

History
Along with the Sydney Sixers, the Sydney Thunder are the successors of the New South Wales Blues who played in the now-defunct KFC Twenty20 Big Bash. The NSW Cricket board unanimously decided on lime green as the team's colour, though other colours were considered, and rejected as being too close to other Sydney sports teams. Cricket Australia did not allow Cricket NSW to use the sky blue colour traditionally associated with New South Wales sports teams.

The team made their debut in the 2011-12 Big Bash League season – the inaugural season of the Big Bash League. The team performed poorly in its first years in the competition, finishing last in each of its first three seasons and second last in its fourth season.

From 2011 to 2014, the Thunder's home ground was Stadium Australia in Sydney Olympic Park. The team played their final two games of the 2014-15 Big Bash League season at Sydney Showground Stadium after they were unable to use Stadium Australia due to the 2015 AFC Asian Cup association football tournament. In June 2015, the Thunder announced they would leave Stadium Australia and play all home games at Sydney Showground Stadium until the 2024–25 BBL season.

The 2015–16 Big Bash League season marked the first year in which the Thunder finished in the top half of the table, finishing 4th overall. Having won the first three games of the season and boasting a squad including Michael Hussey, Shane Watson, Usman Khawaja and Jacques Kallis, the Thunder soon became the favourites to win the tournament. However, the Thunder lost their following four games and were in danger of missing the finals. In their final game of the 2015–16 Big Bash League season, the Thunder defeated the Sixers for only the second time in their history to book a finals berth. The Thunder faced the Adelaide Strikers at Adelaide Oval in the first semi final, winning convincingly. The Thunder then faced the Stars in the Finals the Melbourne Stars. The final was played at Melbourne Cricket Ground on 24 January 2016 and resulted in the Thunder defeating the Melbourne Stars by 3 wickets. Michael Hussey announced his retirement from domestic cricket during BBL05, at the conclusion of the tournament he was announced the club's Director of Cricket, responsible for managing recruitment, contracts, facilities and scouting for the BBL squad. The Thunder were the most watched sports team in Australia during 2015-16 with an average TV audience of 1.2m.

Shane Watson was elected to captain the side in 2016. Watson captained the Thunder for three seasons, failing to qualify for the finals in each of them. 

In 2019, Callum Ferguson was named as the new Thunder captain, subsequently qualifying for the finals during his two seasons in charge. Chris Green and Jason Sangha shared the captaincy role for the COVID-19 affected 2021-22 season as the Thunder were knocked out in their first finals game after finishing 3rd on the ladder. 

In a league game on 16 December 2022 against the Adelaide Strikers, the Thunder were dismissed for 15 in 5.5 overs, breaking the record for both the shortest completed innings and the lowest score in one in all men's professional T20 matches.

Role in the community

MoneyGram Thunder Nation Cup

The MoneyGram Thunder Nation Cup gives cricket players from seven cultural backgrounds the chance to experience the fun and excitement of Twenty20 cricket, whilst representing their community. The winning team from each community cricket round will represent their country in the MoneyGram Thunder Nation Cup Semi Finals, with the two winners of the semi-finals playing off in a Grand Final prior to a Sydney Thunder match at Spotless Stadium.

Thunder Bus

The Thunder Bus travels around schools and cricket club in Sydney and Regional NSW, it has an interactive quiz and inflatable nets. The Thunder Bus directly engaged with 100,000 children aged between 5- 12 during this period and was seen by over 1 Million people.

Personnel
Sydney Thunder, like every other team, had a salary cap of $1 million for the first season of the Big Bash League, but in that season they spent almost half of the salary cap on the explosive opening combination of Chris Gayle and David Warner. Gayle was pursued by Perth Scorchers but he rejected an offer of $250,000 to stay with the New South Wales team.

Current squad

Year-by-year record

Captains list

Honours

Domestic
Big Bash:
Champions (1): 2015–16
Runners-Up (0):
Minor Premiers (0):
Finals Series Appearances (5): 2015–16, 2019–20, 2020–21, 2021–22, 2022–23
Wooden Spoons (4): 2011–12, 2012–13, 2013–14, 2016–17

Sydney Smash 
When the league began in 2011, Cricket Australia decided they would place two teams in Sydney. With the core group of players for both sides coming from the New South Wales cricket team, this rivalry automatically becomes widely anticipated in Sydney. In the first four seasons of the BBL the Thunder lost all seven Sydney Derby games to the Sixers. However, in the first match of the fifth Big Bash League, the Thunder scored their first win against the Sixers, breaking the hoodoo set in place by their rivals in Magenta. The season also marked the first time the Thunder beat the Sixers in both games contested during the season. As at 2020, all subsequent seasons have had one win by each team.

List of Sydney Smash matches

Sponsors

Imported players
The following players have been imported to play for Sydney Thunder in the Big Bash League:

+= Did not play a game

See also

Cricket in New South Wales
Cricket NSW
New South Wales Blues
Sydney Sixers

References

External links
 

Cricket in New South Wales
Big Bash League teams
Sports teams in Sydney
Cricket clubs established in 2011